The Arkoudes are a group of rocky islets located off the coast of Milos Island in Greece. The rocks appear to show an opening mouth, a nose, eyes, ears and a body that look rather like bears, whence their name. The rocks are about 20 feet high and the only way to see them is by boat that tours around the island. The natural sculptures are near Plathenia Beach and the entrance of the bay of Milos.

See also
 Milos
 Milos Island National Airport (MLO)
 Antimilos
 Kimolos
 Santorini

External links
https://commons.wikimedia.org/wiki/File:Bear.rock.JPG

Milos